YanYan Li (also stylized as Yanyan Li, Yan-yan Li, and Yan Yan Li) is a Professor of mathematics at Rutgers University, specializing in elliptic partial differential equations. He received his Ph.D. at New York University in 1988, under the direction of Louis Nirenberg. He joined Rutgers University in 1990.

Li was an invited lecturer at the International Congress of Mathematicians in 2002, and is a Fellow of the American Mathematical Society. He has been an ISI Highly Cited Researcher. He is a member of the editorial board of Advances in Mathematics, among several other academic journals.

Major publications 
 Yan Yan Li and Itai Shafrir. Indiana Univ. Math. J. 43 (1994), no. 4, 1255–1270.  
 Yan Yan Li. I. J. Differential Equations 120 (1995), no. 2, 319–410.  
 Yan Yan Li. II. Existence and compactness. Comm. Pure Appl. Math. 49 (1996), no. 6, 541–597.

References

External links 
 YanYan Li's home page at Rutgers
 Mathematics Genealogy page
 Google Scholar page

Living people
Year of birth missing (living people)
Rutgers University faculty
20th-century American mathematicians
21st-century American mathematicians
New York University alumni